The 2012 United States House of Representatives election in Wyoming was held on Tuesday, November 6, 2012, and re-elected Cynthia Lummis as the U.S. representative from the state's at-large congressional district. The election coincided with the elections of other federal and state offices, including a quadrennial presidential election and an election to the U.S. Senate. A primary election was held on August 21, 2012.

Republican primary

Candidates
 Cynthia Lummis, incumbent U.S. Representative

Primary results

Democratic primary

Candidates
 Chris Henrichsen, political science professor at Casper College

Primary results

Minor parties

Candidates
 Richard Brubaker (L), truck driver
 Daniel Cummings (Constitution), physician
 Don Wills (Wyoming Country), software engineer and former chairman of the Libertarian Party of Wyoming

General election

Results

References

External links
Elections Division at the Wyoming Secretary of State
United States House of Representatives elections in Wyoming, 2012 at Ballotpedia
Wyoming U.S. House from OurCampaigns.com
Campaign contributions for U.S. Congressional races in Wyoming from OpenSecrets
Outside spending at the Sunlight Foundation
Campaign websites
Chris Henrichsen campaign website
Cynthia Lummis campaign website

Wyoming
2012
2012 Wyoming elections